Joetta Clark Diggs (née Clark, born August 1, 1962 in East Orange, New Jersey) is a retired American track and field champion, specializing in middle distance running.  She ran for more than 28 consecutive years never missing an indoor or outdoor season, with her races being in the 800 meters and 1500 meters. A 4-time Olympian in 1988, 1992, 1996 and 2000, she competed in every outdoor USA Championships  or Olympic trials  between 1979 and 2000, winning five outdoor championships. Indoors, she was in the national championship race in 18 of the last 19 years, winning seven times. Clark Diggs was ranked in the top 10 in the world since 1991. Moreover, in 1998 at age 36, she was ranked number four in the world. This was her best ranking out of six such appearances.

Coached by Terry Crawford at the University of Tennessee, Clark Diggs left Knoxville with nine collegiate titles (including relays) and a degree in public relations.

Clark Diggs was coached by her brother, J.J. Clark, who is the former women's coach at the University of Tennessee. J.J. also coached two other 800m runners: his wife, Jearl Miles-Clark, and his younger sister, Hazel Clark.  Hazel, Jearl and Joetta were all ranked #1 in America at one point in time. This Clark Team is known as the First Family of Track & Field because of their 800m dominance.  At the 2000 Olympic Trials the family pulled off a remarkable sweep of the three Olympic qualifying positions with Hazel winning, Jearl second and Joetta making her final Olympic team at age 38 in third.  She was the second oldest female Olympic track team member that year and the fifth oldest of all time.  She was the team captain in 2000.  She is the oldest ever to qualify in a track running event.

Later she added a graduate degree in recreation administration. Like her father, educator Joe Louis Clark did, she now works the lecture circuit.

Personal life

Raised in the South Ward of Newark, New Jersey, she lived there during the 1967 riots. Living in South Orange, New Jersey, she attended Columbia High School, where she started her career in track and field, winning the state Meet of Champions in all four years.

She has a husband, Ronald Diggs, who is a businessman, and a daughter, Talitha LaNae Clark Diggs, who was the 2014 USATF | Hershey National Champion in the long jump and 2019 Pennsylvania State Champion at 200 and 400 meters as a high school junior.

Career

She added a graduate degree in recreation administration.

In June 1997, she was appointed by a Governor as one of eight commissioners of the New Jersey Sports and Exposition Authority, where she is responsible for helping to ensure that the Meadowlands Sports Complex continues to serve as a national and international model for sports, racing entertainment and exposition industries.

Clark Diggs was chosen as Sports Illustrated Hometown Hero for her work with youth, and in 1998 she also received the Visa Humanitarian award for her involvement with children. In October, Clark Diggs received the New Jersey Pioneer Women of the 90s Award. Moreover, because of her longevity, and consistency, she is considered by sports enthusiasts as "America’s most successful middle distance runner" ever.

A motivational and personal inspiration speaker, Clark Diggs is the daughter of Jetta Clark and noted educator Dr. Joe Clark. Joe Clark was the subject of the movie Lean on Me. Clark Diggs has continued to use her talents and experiences in sports, marketing, consulting and public speaking to provide services to her community, state and nation.  As President of Joetta Sports & Beyond, LLC, Clark Diggs delivers messages of health, fitness and empowerment to corporations, colleges, medical programs and civic organizations on the lecture circuit.  She is the author of Joetta’s "P" Principles for Success, Life Lessons Learned From Track & Field and the Executive Director of the Joetta Clark Diggs Sports Foundation, which promotes involvement with physical activities for school-aged children and provides opportunities for children in the sports and entertainment industry.

Honors

Inducted into the New Jersey Hall of Fame, Class of 2013
Author, Joetta's "P" Principles for Success: Life Lessons Learned from Track & Field
Selected by the Star Ledger, which is NJ State's Paper
As the Women Athlete of the Century
2000 Women Olympic Team Captain
Inducted into the USA Track & Field Hall of Fame 2009
Inducted into Penn Relays Hall of Fame – 2004
Inducted into the University of Tennessee's Hall of Fame
Chosen as Sports Illustrated Hometown Hero
Received the VISA Humanitarian Award
Undefeated in the 800m all four years while at Columbia High School
15- time All American
9-Time NCAA Champion
11-Time USA National Champion
Selected to Who's Who of American Women – 2000
Received New Jersey Pioneer of the 90s Award
Inducted into Millrose Games Hall of Fame at Madison Square Garden – 2002
Featured on MSNBC News Broadcast
Featured on CNN
Featured in Jet Magazine
Featured in Women's Sports and Fitness Magazine
Featured Documentary on Madison Square Garden Network
Distinguished Honoree Award-Somerset County Commission on Status of Women – 2001
Received Key to the City of Newark – 1990
New Jersey Scholastic Coaches Association Distinguished Award – 2001
Rolling Hills Girl Scouts Women of Achievement Award
Board Member of the Raritan Valley Community College 2001
Board Member of the Business Partnership of Somerset County

References

External links 

1962 births
Living people
People from South Orange, New Jersey
Sportspeople from Essex County, New Jersey
Track and field athletes from New Jersey
American female middle-distance runners
Athletes (track and field) at the 1988 Summer Olympics
Athletes (track and field) at the 1992 Summer Olympics
Athletes (track and field) at the 1996 Summer Olympics
Athletes (track and field) at the 2000 Summer Olympics
Olympic track and field athletes of the United States
Universiade medalists in athletics (track and field)
Columbia High School (New Jersey) alumni
Goodwill Games medalists in athletics
Universiade bronze medalists for the United States
Medalists at the 1987 Summer Universiade
Competitors at the 1990 Goodwill Games
Competitors at the 1994 Goodwill Games
Competitors at the 1998 Goodwill Games
21st-century American women